Gil Vicente Futebol Clube, commonly known as Gil Vicente, founded in 1924, is a Portuguese football club that plays in Barcelos. It competes in the Primeira Liga, the top division of football in the country, and it is named after the Portuguese playwright of the same name. The best seasons for the team was in 1999–2000 and 2021–22 Primeira Liga, when they finished fifth in the league.

History

Early years
Gil Vicente Futebol Clube was founded on 3 May 1924, after the creation of other short-lived clubs in Barcelos, such as Barcellos Sporting Club and União Foot-ball Club Barcellense. A group of friends who would gather in the theater square (Largo do Teatro, currently Largo Doutor Martins Lima), naming the club after the theater, itself named after the Portuguese playwright. The initial name of the club was Gil Vicente Football Barcelense, including a mention of its city that was lost through time. Despite the foundation in 1924, only in 1931 did the club register in the Braga Football Association, participating in the following year in the district league after the city cup against Barcelos Sporting Club.

In 1943 (possibly 1953), the club is promoted to the Second Division, and one year later stops participating in the regional championship to play in a national league starting.

The first record of a game abroad is in April 1953 against Tuy Racing Club.

Gil Vicente achieved a club record semi-final in the Portuguese Cup in 1976-77, losing against SC Braga only after a replay match. In the following edition, the club reached the quarter-finals, losing against FC Porto.

Ascent to top tier
In the 1980s Gil Vicente improved and reached two third places in the North section of the second division. In 1989–90 Segunda Divisão, led by Rodolfo Reis, the team finally achieved promotion to the top tier, winning the North Zone and obtaining a second place in the championship-playoff against Salgueiros and Farense. Despite the success, the season is marked by a controversial decision. An electrical failure in an away match at Maia during a 2-0 Gil Vicente lead with 16 minutes left led to the game being interrupted. The Portuguese Football Federation first awards Gil Vicente a 3-0 win and fines Maia, but the decision would later be changed and the clubs were ordered to repeat the entire match, something which the club claims was inconsistent with another decision in the same year.

In 1990-91, the first season in the top tier, Gil Vicente narrowly avoided relegation. There were 20 participants, with 5 relegation spots, due to a planned decreased to 18 clubs. Gil Vicente finished 13-th with 33 points, the same as relegated Tirsense. The compact Estádio Adelino Ribeiro Novo proved to be a tough spot for visitors, as only champions Benfica and runner-ups FC Porto able to win.

For 1991-92, the club hired former FC Porto and Sporting CP legend António Oliveira as a manager. The club finished 13th again, 2 points clear of relegation. Relegation was avoided with a 1-0 win over already-crowned champions FC Porto with a goal scored by Morato. Another highlight was reaching the quarter-finals of the Cup, losing to Boavista 1-0 at home.

Vítor Oliveira was hired to managed the team for the 1992-93 campaign. Gil Vicente had a tough start, losing three of the first four matches, including a 7-1 thrashing at Marítimo. The season recovered and the team went on to take a home win and an away draw agianst eventual third-placed Sporting CP and a home draw against runner-ups SL Benfica. The team finished a club record ninth, 3 points clear of relegation. Ljubinko Drulović was the team's star, scoring 10 goals. He would be transferred to Porto in the Winter of the following season, featuring in all of the teams who won the historic five consecutive league titles.

Oliveira was kept for the following two campaigns. In 1993-94, Gil Vicente finished tenth, 5 points of relegation. Highlights include one away and two home draws against the eventual top 3 teams. Home games were again a team strength, with only Porto and Benfica achieving fewer than 2 losses. In 1994-95, the team struggled more. It achieved only 7 wins, tied for third-worst in the league. Despite this, its league-leading 13 draws were enough to secure 13th, 3 points clear of relegation. Surprisingly, two of the seven wins came against runner-ups Benfica, both 1-0. The home win was ensured with a stoppage penalty scored by Tuck while the away win goal was scored by Congolese striker Makopoloka Mangonga.

For 1995-96, the club hired manager Bernardino Pedroto. The team struggled early, with only 4 points in the first 7 games in the first season where a win was worth 3 points. The form recovered and three well-time consecutive March wins helped achieve 12th place, 3 points clear of relegation. This was the season where hometown player Carlitos established himself in the first teamm, playing 33 league games and scoring 5 goals, both team-leading statistics.

Relegation and return
The 1996-97 was disastrous and the team finished bottom of the league with 19 points, 11 points behind the closest opponent. Pedroto was replaced after the a 1-0 away loss against Espinho in December, achieving only 4 points in the first 12 games. Incoming manager Fernando Festas achieved only one win before being replaced in March after a 4-1 away loss against Chaves. Assistant coach José Marconi led the team until the end of the season, taking two wins in the last 10 games, but coaching the team through its worst defeat in the top tier: a 7-0 away loss at Boavista.

In 1997-98, Henrique Nunes was hired to manage the team. Gil Vicente achieved the fourth position in the league, 2 points behind promoted Alverca. The club actually celebrated promotion at one point, as Alverca were a satellite club of SL Benfica, and thus forbidden from promotion to the top tier according to the relegation. As the season approached, Alverca, at the time led by future SL Benfica chairman Luís Filipe Vieira asked to be removed of the satellite status a few weeks before the end of the season. The request was approved by the Portuguese Football Federation and Gil Vicente would remain in the second tier for another season despite a court appeal.

In 1998-99 Gil Vicente finally obtained its first national silverware. The team won the Second Division with 68 points, 7 points clear of second place. Led by Álvaro Magalhães and with goal scoring forwards Almani Moreira and Diocleciano Tavares, both with 12 goals, the team also had a higlight 3-2 home win against Sporting in the fourth round of the Portuguese Cup. The club celebrated the promotion and its 75th birthday with a friendly against SL Benfica in June 1999.

Magalhães remained at the helm as Gil Vicente obtained a club record Primeira Liga fifth place in the 1999-2000 season, which would have been enough for a UEFA Cup spot in the previous season. The team was also a protagonist of the last matchday. Already out of contention for the fourth place, the team hosted FC Porto, who was 1 point behind leaders Sporting CP, who were on a 18-year spell without a league title. Gil Vicente beat FC Porto 2-1 with goals by Lemos, Carlitos and former player Drulović.

In the following two seasons, the club returned to more typical league finishes in the bottom half of the table. Vítor Oliveira returned to manage the club in December 2001, taking over the job of Luís Campos. In the 2002-03 season the team achieved eigth place with 44 points. The season included 2 wins against Sporting, including a 3-0 away win at Estádio José Alvalade, with goals from Manoel, Gaspar, and Paulo Alves. In February 2003, Luís Loureiro became the first squad player to be receive a call up to the Portuguese national football team.

In the following two seaons, Gil Vicente achieved consecutive 12th and 13th places, with 40 points, both seasons marked by coaching changes: from Mário Reis to Luís Campos and then to Ulisses Morais.

In the 2005–06 Primeira Liga, Gil Vicente fielded an ineligible player being Angolan forward Mateus in the "Mateus Affair". They therefore lost the right to participate in the 2006–07 Primeira Liga, and Belenenses were allowed to stay up. Gil Vicente were accused by the special sports instances that rule Portuguese football of illegally resorting to regular courts on the dispute of Mateus, according to Gil Vicente, illegal contract with his former employer, FC Lixa.

Still convinced this is not a sports-related case but rather work-related, Gil Vicente continued in the courts. Along with the relegation, they were also suspended from the Taça de Portugal for one season.

On 29 May 2011, the club returned to the top flight as champions of the 2010–11 Liga de Honra with a 3–1 home win over C.D. Fátima in front of a club record crowd; manager Paulo Alves beat C.D. Feirense on goal difference to the title, and the key players were strikers Hugo Vieira and Zé Luís. The club finished as runners-up of the 2011–12 Taça da Liga, eliminating Sporting CP from the groups, S.C. Braga on penalties in the semi-final and losing 2–1 to S.L. Benfica in the final in Coimbra.

A four-year spell in the top flight ended in 2014–15, when Gil Vicente lost 2–1 at F.C. Penafiel in the penultimate round of matches. On 29 April 2018, the club slipped into the third tier for the first time since 1971, but had a place in the 2019–20 Primeira Liga secured as a result of the appeal against the "Matheus Affair". On May 8, 2022, Gil Vicente qualified for a European competition, UEFA Europa Conference League, for the first time in their history, after finishing fifth in the 2021–22 Primeira Liga season.

Other sports
While today only the football section exists, Gil Vicente has had a roller hockey team, and athletes representing the club in cycling and pedestrianism.

Stadium
The clubs that preceded Gil Vicente had their first games in Campo da Feira and in Campo Dom Carlos (today's Campo 25 de Abril). União Foot-ball Club Barcelense had its first field in Campo da Granja, next to the city's cemetery, playing its first game on April 30, 1922, against Desportivo Famalicense, 3 days before the official inauguration during the city festival (Festa das Cruzes) with a game between FC Porto and SC Salgueiros. Eleven years later, in May 1933, with the decline of its rival club, Gil Vicente took over the field. The first struggles of the young team were mainly about finding a pitch to play. Back then, the team would play in the Campo da Estação (Station Field), which belonged to another club, Triunfo Sport Club. On 3 May 1933, Gil Vicente played on its first field, Campo da Granja, against neighbours SC Braga. 

In 16 September 1945, goalkeeper Adelino Ribeiro Novo died in Campo da Granja after a collision with an opponent during a match against CD Aves. In January 1946, the field was renamed after him as a tribute. In 8 November 1987, the city donated the stadium to Gil Vicente and the club inaugurates its new headquarters. It currently hosts the clubs youth squads, as well as training sessions and friendly games.

In 1992, the city bought land in the parish of Vila Boa, Barcelos to build a new stadium. Construction for the new Estádio Cidade de Barcelos began in 2001 and in 2002 the first stand was built. The stadium cost 16 million euro. The stadium was inaugurated in 30 May 2004 with a friendly between Gil Vicente and Uruguyan club Club Nacional de Football, ending with a 2-1 loss for the home team, with goals by O.J. Morales, Chory Castro, and Paulo Alves. The first official match was a 0-1 loss against Boavista F.C. on 10 September 2004, with Zé Manel scoring the first official goal. The first Gil Vicente win came two weeks later on September 26, with a 3-1 win over Moreirense F.C., with hometown player Carlitos scoring the first official goal for Gil Vicente in the new stadium. Since then, the Cidade de Barcelos has hosted a friendly game between the Portugal and Canada, as well as 2 group stage games of the UEFA Under-21 European Championship. In May 2020, the city approved the construction of the second stage of the stadium, which will include two adjacent football fields.

Colours and crest
The club's first kit was red. Later kits were green and white horizontally striped, yellow and red (colours of the city), and blue. The club's modern main kit is usually red, while alternative kits vary, but are usually blue and white.

Honours
 Segunda Liga
 Winners (2): 1998–99, 2010–11

 Taça da Liga
 Runners-up (1): 2011–12

League and cup history

In Europe

Players

Out on loan

Coaching staff

Notable former players

Source: PlaymakerStats

List criteria
 player has played 100 games for the club in the Portuguese top flight,
 player has scored 15 goals for the club in the Portuguese top flight.
 played at least one top flight game for the club and won an international title while playing for the club
 played in a FIFA World Cup or senior continental competition while playing for the club
 played for the Portuguese national football team while playing for the club

 Player currently in the squad.

Managerial history

  José Maria Furtado (1974–75)
  José Carlos (1986–88)
  Mário Reis (1988–89)
  Rodolfo Reis (1989–91)
  António Oliveira (July 1, 1991 – June 30, 1992)
  Vítor Oliveira (1992–95)
  Bernardino Pedroto (1995–96)
  Fernando Festas (1996–97)
  Diamantino Miranda (1997–98)
  Henrique Nunes (1998)
  Álvaro Magalhães (1998–00)
  Luís Campos (2000–02)
  Vítor Oliveira (2002–03)
  Luís Campos (July 1, 2003 – Oct 28, 2004)
  Ulisses Morais (Oct 28, 2004 – March 7, 2006)
  Paulo Alves (March 7, 2006 – May 15, 2008)
  Prof. Neca (May 26, 2008 – Nov 17, 2008)
  Manuel Ribeiro (interim) (Nov 18, 2008 – Feb 16, 2009)
  João Eusébio (Feb 17, 2009 – May 25, 2009)
  Rui Quinta (June 6, 2009 – Feb 27, 2010)
  Paulo Alves (March 5, 2010 – May 13)
  João de Deus (May 30, 2013 – Aug 31 2014)
  José Mota (Sept 2, 2014 – May 26, 2015)
  Nandinho (May 28, 2015 – May 11, 2016)
  Vítor Oliveira (2019–2020)
  Rui Almeida (July – November 2020)
  Ricardo Soares (November 13, 2020 – 2022)
  Ivo Vieira (2022)
  Daniel Sousa (November 16, 2022 – present)

Notes

References

External links
  
 Club Profile at LPFP 
 Club Profile & Squad  at ForaDeJogo 
 official facebook
 instagram

 
Football clubs in Portugal
Association football clubs established in 1924
1924 establishments in Portugal
Primeira Liga clubs
Liga Portugal 2 clubs